Romas Mažeikis (born 28 April 1964) is a retired Lithuanian international footballer who played as a defender for clubs in the Soviet Union, Austria and Germany.

Club career
Born in Gargždai, Mažeikis began playing professional football for FK Žalgiris Vilnius in the Soviet First League. Žalgiris won the league in 1982, and he would spend the next seven seasons playing for the club appearing in 159 Soviet Top League matches. When Žalgiris left the Soviet league in 1990, he joined Georgian side FC Guria Lanchkhuti for the remainder of the season.

Mažeikis returned to the Soviet Top League with FC Lokomotiv Moscow the following season, appearing in 24 matches as the club finished in last place. After relegation, he left for Austrian side Kremser SC. He also had brief spells with Georgian side FC Antsi Tbilisi and Lithuanian side FK Panerys Vilnius.

In July 1993, Mažeikis moved to Germany where he would finish his career with VfB Lübeck.

International career
Mažeikis made 19 appearances for the Lithuania national football team from 1990 to 1994.

References

External links

Profile at KLISF

1964 births
Living people
Soviet footballers
Lithuanian footballers
Lithuania international footballers
Lithuanian expatriate footballers
Soviet Top League players
FK Žalgiris players
FK Panerys Vilnius players
FC Guria Lanchkhuti players
FC Lokomotiv Moscow players
VfB Lübeck players
Expatriate footballers in Austria
Expatriate footballers in Germany
People from Gargždai
Association football defenders